Maharaj Nakorn Chiang Mai Hospital is a university teaching hospital, affiliated to the Faculty of Medicine of Chiang Mai University, located in Mueang Chiang Mai District, Chiang Mai Province. It is a hospital capable of super tertiary care and is the first university hospital in Northern Thailand, and the first to be located outside Bangkok. The hospital is known as 'Suandok Hospital' locally, due to its close proximity to Suan Dok Gate.

History 

Maharaj Nakorn Chiang Mai Hospital features world-renowned physicians that utilise the latest cutting-edge medical technology and has exceptional nursing staff members that have undergone overseas training who can provide patients with top quality medical care. The hospital strives to create a serene ambience for their patients who are mostly multi-cultural and from a variety of countries. There are also translators who are onboard and can speak over 30 different languages. The hospital is generally regarded as one of the final referral centers for complicated and rare diseases from all hospitals, especially within Northern Thailand.

Thai is the main language used within the hospital. Most staff can also speak English.

In 1939, a new hospital was planned to be built near Suan Dok Gate, in order to increase provision of healthcare in Chiang Mai and spread patients to other facilities as the original 'Chiang Mai Hospital' had a capacity of only 11 beds and was unsuitable for expansion. As construction was completed in 1941, there was a lack of medical personnel available, so operations were transferred from Chiang Mai City Municipality to the Ministry of Public Health (MOPH) and the hospital was opened on 24 June 1941 as 'Nakorn Chiang Mai Hospital'. The hospital then underwent extensive expansion using financial aid from donations of local citizens and businesses, including aid from the United States government under the presidency of Harry S. Truman, as well as aid from the World Health Organisation. The funding contributed to the construction of X-ray imaging facilities, operating theaters and the pediatric ward of the hospital.

The first regional medical school was then approved by the cabinet in 1956 and set up by the University of Medical Sciences (now Mahidol University) as the Faculty of Medicine Nakorn Chiang Mai Hospital and teaching was done at the hospital. On 1 January 1959, operations were transferred from the MOPH to the University of Medical Sciences. Chiang Mai University was then founded in 1964 by royal decree and operations were transferred to Chiang Mai University.

On 25 July 1983, the hospital was renamed 'Maharaj Nakorn Chiang Mai Hospital', in honour of King Bhumibol Adulyadej.

See also 

Healthcare in Thailand
 Hospitals in Thailand
 List of hospitals in Thailand

References 

 Article incorporates material from the corresponding article in the Thai Wikipedia.

Hospitals in Thailand
Chiang Mai University
Teaching hospitals in Thailand
Buildings and structures in Chiang Mai